Winter Words - Hits & Rareties is a compilation album by All About Eve by their then-former record label Mercury with whom they had had an acrimonious split one year earlier.

It contained two previously unreleased songs. Another similar compilation, The Best of All About Eve, was released in July 1999, although both have now been superseded by Keepsakes.

Track listing - Winter Words 
 "Our Summer"
 "Flowers In Our Hair"
 "In the Clouds"
 "Martha's Harbour"
 "Every Angel"
 "Wild Hearted Woman"
 "What Kind of Fool"
 "Road to Your Soul"
 "Scarlet"
 "December"
 "Farewell Mr Sorrow"
 "Strange Way"
 "The Dreamer"
 "Paradise"
 "Candy Tree"
 "Drowning"
 "Wild Flowers"
 "Theft" +
 "Different Sky" +

Notes

+ New tracks previously unreleased.

"Theft" was mis-titled - apparently it should have been called "If I Had You".

Track listing - The Best of All About Eve 
 "Our Summer"
 "Lady Moonlight"
 "Flowers in Our Hair"
 "Paradise"
 "Gypsy Dance"
 "In the Meadow"
 "Every Angel"
 "Martha's Harbour"
 "What Kind of Fool"
 "Gold and Silver"
 "Candy Tree"
 "Road to Your Soul"
 "Tuesday's Child"
 "Different Sky"
 "Farewell Mr Sorrow"
 "Wishing the Hours Away"
 "Are You Lonely"
 "Share It With Me"

References

All About Eve (band) compilation albums
Albums produced by Paul Samwell-Smith
1992 greatest hits albums
1999 greatest hits albums
Mercury Records compilation albums